KBYB (101.7 FM, "Hot FM") is a radio station broadcasting a country music format. Licensed to Hope, Arkansas, United States, it serves the Texarkana area. The station is currently owned by Texarkana Radio Center Licenses, LLC.    Studios are located on Olive in Texarkana, Texas just one block west of the Texas/Arkansas state line and its transmitter is north of Fulton, Arkansas.

History
On May 28, 2013, KBYB changed their format from adult hits (as "Bob FM") to country, branded as "101.7 Hot FM".

Translator

References

External links

 

BYB
Country radio stations in the United States
Radio stations established in 1993
1993 establishments in Arkansas